Damario Ambrose  (born September 9, 1989) is an American football linebacker who is currently a free agent. He played college football at Arkansas. Ambrose entered the 2011 NFL Draft but went undrafted. He was signed by the St. Louis Rams as an undrafted free agent in 2011.

Early years
Ambrose was born in Mobile, Alabama and attended Davidson High School. After his Senior season in high school, Ambrose was selected to the second-team all-region honors. He was ranked the No. 19 prospect in State of Alabama and was ranked the No. 35 strong side defensive end in the nation.

College career
Ambrose played at the University of Arkansas. He finished college with 79 tackles, 6.5 sacks and a forced fumble.

In his Freshman season, he finished the season with 12 tackles and a sack. In 2007, he received the SEC First-team All-Freshman honors. On October 1, 2007, Ambrose was named the SEC Defensive Lineman of the Week for his performance against North Texas in which Arkansas Razorbacks won the game 66–7.

In his Sophomore season, he finished the season with 21 tackles along with 2 sacks.

In the Junior season, he played and started 13 games in which he had 13 tackles. On November 7, 2009, he recorded 3 tackles against South Carolina in which Arkansas wins the game 33–16.

In his Senior season, he finished the season with 33 tackles, 3.5 sacks, a pass defended and a Forced fumble. On September 18, 2010, he recorded 4 tackles along with 2 sacks and a forced fumble against Georgia as Arkansas wins 31–24.

Professional career

St. Louis Rams
He was signed by the St. Louis Rams as an undrafted free agent. On September 3, 2011 he was released a couple of days before the 2011 regular season.

New York Jets
On August 3, 2012 Ambrose signed with the New York Jets. On August 27, 2012, he was released.

Iowa Barnstormers
On December 3, 2012, he signed with the Iowa Barnstormers of the Arena Football League. On March 16, 2013, he was placed on injured reserve.

References

External links
 Arkansas Razorbacks bio
 New York Jets bio
 Iowa Barnstormers bio

1989 births
Living people
American football linebackers
Arkansas Razorbacks football players
St. Louis Rams players
New York Jets players
African-American players of American football
Iowa Barnstormers players
Sportspeople from Mobile, Alabama
Players of American football from Alabama
21st-century African-American sportspeople
20th-century African-American people